Ponce Vela de Cabrera, also known as Ponce Vélaz de Cabrera (died 24 September 1202), was a noble from the Kingdom of León who played an important role during the reign of Alfonso IX.  Through one of his sons descends the Ponce de León, "one of the most illustrious aristocratic houses of the later Middle Ages".

Biography 
He was the son of  Vela Gutiérrez, son of count Gutierre Vermúdez and countess Toda, daughter of count Pedro Fróilaz de Traba, and of Sancha Ponce de Cabrera, daughter of  Ponce Giraldo de Cabrera and Sancha Núñez. Ponce had several brothers and sisters: Fernando, Pedro, María, and Juan Vela.

He starts to appear in royal charters in 1176, and served as the alférez of King Alfonso IX in 1185 and in the following year, in which he was also appointed tenant-in-chief of Mansilla and other villages and regions that had been governed by his relatives count Suero Vermúdez and Pedro Alfonso, including Tineo and Babia, Gozón, and Cabezón. He also governed Mayorga, Zamora, and El Bierzo.

He died on 24 September 1202 and was buried in the Monastery of Santa María de Nogales in San Esteban de Nogales that had been founded by his parents.

Marriage and issue 
Count Ponce Vela married Teresa Rodríguez Giron, daughter of Rodrigo Gutiérrez Girón and his first wife, María de Guzmán. In 1195, Pontius Velez una cum uxore mea, Tharesia Rodrigues (Ponce Vela with my wife, Teresa Rodríguez) donated one-third of Granucillo that he had inherited from his parents to the Monastery of Nogales. The offspring of this marriage were:

 Juan Ponce de Cabrera
 Fernando Ponce de Cabrera
 Pedro Ponce de Cabrera (died between 1248 and 1254), married Aldonza Alfonso, illegitimate daughter of King Alfonso IX and his mistress Aldonza Martínez de Silva This marriage gave rise to the powerful house of the Ponce de León which held titles in the late Middle Ages of the dukedoms of Arcos and Cádiz.

References

Bibliography 
 
  
 
 
 
 

12th-century births
1202 deaths
12th-century nobility from León and Castile